Ramzi Solan (born 18 April 1998) is a Saudi Arabian professional footballer who plays as a forward for Najran on loan from Damac.

Career
On October 27, 2016, Solan left boyhood club Al-Tuhami and joined Al-Faisaly. Solan signed a 5-year professional contract with Al-Faisaly on January 31, 2018. On January 8, 2019, Solan joined fellow Pro League side Al-Batin on loan until the end of the 2018–19 season. On October 5, 2020, Solan joined Damac. On January 31, 2022, Solan was loaned out to FDL side Al-Nahda. On 8 September 2022, Solan joined Najran on loan.

Career statistics

Club

References

External links
 

1998 births
Living people
People from Jizan Province
Saudi Arabian footballers
Association football forwards
Saudi Second Division players
Saudi Professional League players
Saudi First Division League players
Al Tuhami Club players
Al-Faisaly FC players
Al Batin FC players
Damac FC players
Najran SC players
Al-Nahda Club (Saudi Arabia) players
Saudi Arabia youth international footballers